Somar Jan (also Romanized as Somār Jān; also known as Somād Jān) is a village in Simakan Rural District, in the Central District of Bavanat County, Fars Province, Iran. As of the 2006 census, its population was 174, in 40 families.

References 

Populated places in Bavanat County